Sir Kenneth Adam  (born Klaus Hugo George Fritz Adam; 5 February 1921 – 10 March 2016) was a German-British movie production designer, best known for his set designs for the James Bond films of the 1960s and 1970s, as well as for Dr. Strangelove.

Adam won two Academy Awards for Best Art Direction. Born in Berlin, he relocated to England with his Jewish family at the age of 13 soon after the Nazis came to power. Together with his younger brother, Denis Adam, he was one of only three German-born pilots to serve in the Royal Air Force during the Second World War.

Early life
Adam was born in 1921 in Berlin to an upper-middle-class secular Jewish family, the third child of Lilli and Fritz Adam, a former Prussian cavalry officer who had served with the Zieten Hussars. Fritz had been awarded the Iron Cross Second Class and the Iron Cross First Class for his service in the First World War.

Fritz co-owned a well-known high-fashion clothing and sporting goods store called S. Adam (Berlin, Leipziger Straße/Friedrichstraße) together with his three brothers, George, Siegfried and Otto Adam.
The company had been established in 1863 by Saul Adam. Klaus (Ken) had two older siblings, Peter, Loni and a younger brother Dieter (1 February 1924 – 17 October 2018).

The family lived an almost idyllic, privileged existence until the Nazi Party came to power.

His older brother Peter was good friends with Gottfried Reinhardt the son of theatre and film director Max Reinhardt and they would often take the young Klaus out with them. As a result, he got to know Max Reinhardt and many other people in the German theatre. Gottfried Reinhardt later became a film director and producer.

England
The combination of his brother Dieter at the age of nine having a fight with a playground bully wearing a Hitler Youth uniform and the increasing discrimination against Jews convinced their parents to send Klaus and Dieter to Craigend Park boarding school in Edinburgh. Upon arrival Klaus anglicised his name to Kenneth and eventually Ken while his brother Dieter changed his to Denis. Their oldest brother Peter was at the time studying law at the University of Clermont-Ferrand in France and decided to move to England and complete his studies there.

The rest of the Adam family stayed in Germany as Adam's father felt that the Nazis were only a temporary aberration and they would wait it out. Things however continued to deteriorate with Jewish stores being boycotted and targeted for attacks in April 1933.

During the summer of 1933, Max Reich, a senior employee of the family business, and then Fritz Adam were arrested. Reich was a member of the SS and leader of the business's Nazi cell. Reich was eventually released and Fritz Adam was released and put under house arrest for three days. Inquiries determined that a former employee who had been dismissed for dishonesty had accused the two men of unfair dismissal and conspiring to maintain undeclared funds in Switzerland. It took two weeks to disprove both allegations and no charges were laid against either man.
Reluctantly coming to the conclusion that Jews had no future in Germany, Fritz, Lilli and Loni, as well as some of Ken's aunts and uncles, fled to England in the summer of 1934. The family eventually settled in the Hampstead area of London the following year.

The family were declared refugees on their arrival to England and identified as "friendly aliens" with the exception of Denis who was too young to be classified. The family arrived in England with nothing other than some gold coins Lilli had smuggled out. His mother who had never previously worked in her life used the little money they had to establish and run a boarding house. His father struggled with his change in status and starting over in a new country. His father started an import-export business selling gloves but his health deteriorated and he died in 1936 when he was 56 years old.

Adam left the boarding school in Edinburgh to rejoin his parents in London and continued his education at St. Paul's School in London. At his mother's boarding house Adam became increasingly interested in cinema after coming into contact with a number of artists among the Jewish refugees who were boarding there. He was introduced to Vincent Korda, a Hungarian art director, when he was working on Knight Without Armour at Denham Film Studios. Korda not only nurtured Adam's passion for films, but encouraged him to train as an architect if he was interested in becoming a production designer. Leaving school he became an apprentice at the firm of CW Glover & Partners (which specialized in making bomb shelters) and he signed up for evening classes at the Bartlett School of Architecture at University College London. Among his tutors was a part-time teacher who had been an assistant of famed German architect Erich Mendelsohn from whom Adam learned valuable architectural drawing techniques.

World War II
When World War II began, Adam was working on designs for air-raid shelters and illustrated books on air-raid protection and gas masks. As German citizens, the Adam family could have been interned as enemy aliens, but in October 1940 Adam was able to join the Pioneer Corps, a support unit of the British Army open to citizens of Axis countries resident in the UK and other Commonwealth countries, provided they were not considered a risk to security. Adam was seconded to design bomb shelters.

After eight months service in the Pioneer Corps, Adam's application to join the Royal Air Force Volunteer Reserve as a pilot was accepted. After initial flight training on de Havilland Tiger Moth biplanes in Scotland, he was sent to Canada and the United States for additional training. Among his instructors was British actor Michael Rennie.

Flight Lieutenant Adam joined No. 609 Squadron at RAF Lympne on 1 October 1943. He was nicknamed "Heinie the tank-buster" by his comrades for his daring exploits. The squadron flew the Hawker Typhoon, initially in support of USAAF long-range bombing missions over Europe. Later they were employed in support of ground troops, including at the battle of the Falaise Gap, in Normandy after D-Day. In 1944, his brother Denis joined No. 183 Squadron, joining Adam in No. 123 Wing. There were four squadrons in the wing: 164, 183, 198 and 609.

Together with his brother Denis, Adam was one of three German-born pilots to serve in the Royal Air Force during the Second World War, the third being Peter Stevens. As such, if they had been captured by the Germans, they were liable to execution as traitors rather than being treated as prisoners of war.

Following the end of the war Adam was the Allied officer in charge of German labour rebuilding Wunstorf Air Base. Adam naturalised as a British subject on 27 December 1946 and left the RAF upon his demobilisation in 1947.

Film career

Adam entered the film industry as a draughtsman on This Was a Woman (1948) at Riverside Studios in Hammersmith. His first major screen credit was as production designer on the British thriller Soho Incident (1956). Working in 1952 for art director Paul Sheriff on the Burt Lancaster film The Crimson Pirate, Adam designed an 18th-century hot-air balloon, a flame-throwing tank, and a rowing boat that transformed into a submarine.

In the mid-1950s, he worked (uncredited) on the epics Around the World in 80 Days (also 1956) and Ben-Hur (1959), directed by William Wyler.

In 1956 he assisted art director Edward Carrere with the sets for Helen of Troy.

His first major credit was for the horror film Night of the Demon (1957), directed by Jacques Tourneur, and he was also the production designer on several films directed by Robert Aldrich.
The first public knowledge of his expertise came when he won an award for the sets of The Trials of Oscar Wilde at the Moscow Film Festival in 1960.

He was hired for the first James Bond film, Dr. No (1962). Adam did not work in the second James Bond film, From Russia with Love (1963), because he was working on Stanley Kubrick's Dr. Strangelove (1964). His work on this film was described by the British Film Institute (BFI) as "gleaming and sinister". Steven Spielberg even called it "the best set that's ever been designed". He turned down the opportunity to work on Kubrick's next project, 2001: A Space Odyssey (1968), after he found out that Kubrick had been working with NASA for a year on space exploration, and that it would put him at a disadvantage in developing his art.

This enabled Adam to make his name with his innovative, semi-futuristic sets for further James Bond films, such as Goldfinger (1964), Thunderball (1965), You Only Live Twice (1967), and Diamonds Are Forever (1971). The supertanker set for The Spy Who Loved Me (1977) was constructed in the largest soundstage in the world at the time. It was lit by Stanley Kubrick in secret. His last Bond film was Moonraker (1979). Writing for The Guardian in 2005, journalist Johnny Dee claimed: "His sets for the seven Bond films he worked on [...] are as iconic as the movies themselves and set the benchmark for every blockbuster".

Adam's other film credits include The Trials of Oscar Wilde (1960), the Michael Caine espionage thriller The Ipcress File (1965) and its sequel Funeral in Berlin (1966), the Peter O'Toole version of Goodbye, Mr. Chips (1969), Sleuth (1972), Salon Kitty (1976), Agnes of God (1985), Addams Family Values (1993), and The Madness of King George (1994). He was also a visual consultant on the film version of Pennies from Heaven (1981), adapted from Dennis Potter's television serial.

Adam returned to work with Kubrick on Barry Lyndon (1975), for which he won his first Oscar. The BFI noted the film's "contrastingly mellow Technicolor beauties" in its depiction of the 18th century. He also designed the famous car for the film Chitty Chitty Bang Bang (1968), which was produced by the same team as the James Bond film series. During the late 1970s, he worked on storyboards and concept art for Star Trek: Planet of the Titans, then in pre-production. The film was eventually shelved by Paramount Pictures.

Adam was a jury member at the 1980 Cannes Film Festival and the 49th Berlin International Film Festival. In 1999, during the Victoria and Albert Museum exhibition "Ken Adam – Designing the Cold War", Adam spoke on his role in the design of film sets associated with the 1960s through the 1980s.

Death
Adam died on 10 March 2016 at his home in London, following a short illness. He was 95 years old.

Personal life
He met his wife Maria-Letizia Moauro while filming The Crimson Pirate on location on the Italian island of Ischia and they married on 16 August 1952.

Legacy
In September 2012, Adam handed over his entire body of work to the Deutsche Kinemathek. The Ken Adam collection comprises approximately 4,000 sketches for films from all periods, photo albums to individual films, storyboards of his employees, memorabilia, military medals, and identity documents, as well as all cinematic awards, including Adam's two Academy Awards.

The Ken Adam Building, a large lot at Pinewood Studios's Buckingham location, bears Adam's name and houses multiple theatres and businesses as well as the Kodak Film Lab and an office of the trade union Bectu.

Honours
Adam was appointed an Officer of the Order of the British Empire in the 1996 New Year Honours for services to the film industry and Knight Bachelor in the 2003 Birthday Honours for services to film production design and to UK–German relations. Adam was appointed a Royal Designer for Industry in 2009.

Filmography

Awards

Notes

References

Further reading

External links

Ken Adam at BFI Screenonline
Ken Adam at Web of Stories
Imperial War Museum Interview from 1997
Imperial War Museum Interview from 1997
Imperial War Museum Interview from 2009
 Interview British Entertainment History Project

1921 births
2016 deaths
Artists from Berlin
Jewish emigrants from Nazi Germany to the United Kingdom
People educated at St Paul's School, London
Alumni of University College London
Royal Pioneer Corps soldiers
Royal Air Force officers
British World War II fighter pilots
British production designers
German designers
British film designers
Best Art Direction Academy Award winners
Best Production Design BAFTA Award winners
Officers of the Order of the British Empire
Knights Bachelor
Französisches Gymnasium Berlin alumni
Naturalised citizens of the United Kingdom
German Royal Air Force pilots of World War II
British Army personnel of World War II
Royal Air Force Volunteer Reserve personnel of World War II
Royal Designers for Industry